Belgachia metro station (or Theism Belgachia metro station for sponsorship reasons) is a station of the Kolkata Metro. It is located at Belgachia.

History
Belgachia Station was commissioned by the Kolkata Metro as part of the first transit line of the metro system, commonly known as the North-South corridor. The station was the penultimate stop before Dum Dum, which, until the opening of the Noapara stop, was the terminal station on the railway system. The station became the first underground station on the northern side and continues to be one of the shallowest, lying at a depth of only 5 metres below Belgachia Road.

As part of the drive to increase non-fare revenue of the Kolkata Metro, the station was leased for branding and semi-naming rights to Kolkata-based conglomerate, Theism Group, rebranding it as Theism Belgachia officially. It was redecorated and rebranded by the corporate organization to become India's first health station.

The station

Structure
Belgachia is underground metro station, situated on the Kolkata Metro Line 1 of Kolkata Metro.

Station layout

Connections

Auto 
Autos ply on Belgachia-Lake Town and Belgachia-Bangur Avenue routes.

Bus
Bus route number 3B (Paikpara), 3C/1, 3C/2, 3D (Paikpara), 3D/1 (Paikpara), 30C, 30D, 47B, 79B, 91, 91A, 93, 211A, 215/1, 219 (Paikpara), 219/1 (Paikpara), 227, DN18, KB16, S160 (Mini), C11, T8, AC40 etc. serve the station.

Train 
Kolkata railway station, Patipukur railway station and Tala railway station are located nearby.

Gallery

Entry/Exit

See also

Kolkata
List of Kolkata Metro stations
Transport in Kolkata
Kolkata Metro Rail Corporation
Kolkata Suburban Railway
Kolkata Monorail
Trams in Kolkata
Belgachia
List of rapid transit systems
List of metro systems

References

External links
 
 Official Website for line 1
 UrbanRail.Net – descriptions of all metro systems in the world, each with a schematic map showing all stations.

Kolkata Metro stations
Railway stations in Kolkata
Railway stations opened in 1984